Metallosia chrysotis is a moth of the subfamily Arctiinae. It was described by George Hampson in 1900. It is found in the Brazilian states of Espírito Santo and Rio de Janeiro.

References

 

Lithosiini
Moths described in 1900